Jerry Byrne may refer to:
Jerry Byrne (baseball) (1907–1955), pitcher in Major League Baseball
Jerry Byrne (singer) (1941–2010), American rock and roll singer
Jerry Byrne MP, Hampden, Newfoundland and Labrador

See also
Gerry Byrne (disambiguation)